Prometheus Entertainment is an American production company, specializing in documentary, reality, and non-fiction television programming and specials.

History 
Prometheus Entertainment was formed in March 1999 by Kevin Burns. It was housed at Fox Television Studios and was originally slated to produce scripted entertainment for Fox, focused on documentaries and non-fiction. In 2002, Prometheus Entertainment developed a revival of Playboy After Dark. In 2008, it signed a deal with the Travel Channel to produce 23 hours' worth of new shows. Their documentary Star Wars: The Legacy Revealed was nominated for three Emmy Awards.

Programs 

The Secret of Skinwalker Ranch, 2020–present
The UnXplained, 2019–present
The Curse of Civil War Gold, 2018–2019
The Tesla Files, 2018
 In Search of Aliens, 2014
 The Curse of Oak Island, 2014–present
 Kendra on Top, 2012-2017
 America's Book of Secrets, 2012–2014
 Food Paradise, 2008–2012
 Kendra, 2009–2011
 Holly's World, 2009–2011
 Ancient Aliens, 2009–present
 The Face Is Familiar, 2009
 Bridget's Sexiest Beaches, 2009
 The Telling, 2009
 Look, Up in the Sky: The Amazing Story of Superman, 2006
 Star Wars Tech, 2007
 High Maintenance 90210, 2007
 Hollywood Science, 2006
 The Girls Next Door, 2005–2010
 Medical Investigation, 2004–2005
 History vs. Hollywood, 2000

TV films 
 Star Wars: The Legacy Revealed, 2007
 Empire of Dreams, 2004

References

External links 
 

Mass media companies established in 1999
Television production companies of the United States
Companies based in Los Angeles
American companies established in 1999